Roy Janse (born 4 June 1971) is a Canadian sailor. He competed in the Tornado event at the 1996 Summer Olympics.

References

External links
 

1971 births
Living people
Canadian male sailors (sport)
Olympic sailors of Canada
Sailors at the 1996 Summer Olympics – Tornado
Sportspeople from Edmonton